The Tacna Department was a territorial division of Chile that existed between 1884 and 1929. It was ceded by the Treaty of Ancón in 1883 and placed under military administration, and then created on the 31st of October 1884, as one of the three departments of the Tacna Province, incorporating as well a disputed claim over Tarata, and was returned to Peru at midnight on the 28th of August 1929, under the terms agreed upon in the Treaty of Lima of the same year.

History
Its limits were defined as the Sama River to the north, the Arica Department to the south, the Andes mountain range to the east, and the Pacific Ocean to the west.

In 1885 Chile integrated Tarata into the province, becoming in 1911 the Tarata Department, as the Chilean government argued the town was to the east of the Sama river. Peru, however, did not recognize this annexation on the grounds that the territory was completely unaffected by the Treaty of Ancón. Around this time, raids by Peruvian smugglers as well as soldiers took place in the region, and there were also claims of military escalation, including claims of Peruvian troops mobilizing near the Chilean border, which were denied by the Peruvian government. In 1921, however, Chile abolished the department, and in 1925 gave back the city to Peru under the mediation of U.S. President Calvin Coolidge, who enforced the limits agreed upon on the north, which did not include the city. Coolidge showed himself to be in favor of the Peruvian claims on several occasions during the duration of the dispute, more so than other heads of state. Around the same time, a commission, headed by U.S. General John J. Pershing arrived to assist with the planned Tacna-Arica plebiscite, which eventually would never take place.

Administration
The Municipality of Tacna oversaw the administration of the department, with its headquarters located in Tacna, where the Departmental Government, and the Provincial Intendancy were located.

With the Decree of Creation of Municipalities of December 22, 1891, the following municipalities were created with their headquarters and whose territories are the sub-delegations detailed below:

On September 1, 1925, the Tarata sub-delegation returned to Peru.

In 1927 the composition of the department was modified and in 1928 the new sub-delegations and communes were defined, which came into force the same year.

See also
Treaty of Ancón
Tacna Province (Chile)

References

1884 establishments in Chile
States and territories disestablished in 1929
States and territories established in 1884
1929 disestablishments in Chile
Former departments of Chile